Pushkar Bhan (1926 in Srinagar – 5 October 2008 in Delhi ) was a radio actor and script writer from Kashmir, India.

Literary career 
He wrote three plays in collaboration with Som Nath Sadhu - Grand Rehearsal (1967), Chapath or Slap (1973) & Nev Nosh or New Bride (1975) & also played a central part in all three. He played the role of villain in first Kashmiri movie "Manzeraat" (1964) along with illustrious actors like Som Nath Sadhu.

Media career 
In 1952, Pushkar joined the All India Radio's Srinagar station as an artist & playwright, and retired as a senior producer in 1985. Bhan acted in Kashmiri films Manziraat (Mehndiraat) & Shayir-e-Kashmir Mehjoor. He has also acted with Bollywood actor Raj Kapoor.
His Kashmiri serial Zoon Dab created media history as it was continuously aired every day for nineteen years.

Awards 
He was awarded the Padma Shri (1974) and the Sahitya Academy Award (1976) for Machamaa which is a collection of humorous plays.

See also 
List of Sahitya Akademi Award winners for Kashmiri

References 

  http://www.koausa.org/Artistes/PBhan/index.html

Kashmiri people
Kashmiri Pandits
Indian people of Kashmiri descent
Indian male radio actors
2008 deaths
1926 births
Recipients of the Sahitya Akademi Award in Kashmiri
Recipients of the Padma Shri in arts